Myrick Davies ( ? – 1781) was an American politician. He served as the Governor of Georgia from 1780 to 1781 after Stephen Heard moved to North Carolina. Following his death in 1781, Nathan Brownson became governor.  Davies was killed by Loyalists.

External links
 Article from the Probert Encyclopedia
Northern, William J. and John Temple Graves. Men of mark in Georgia: a complete and elaborate history of the state from its settlement to the present time, chiefly told in biographies and autobiographies of the most eminent men of each period of Georgia's progress and development. (A. B. Caldwell, 1906) p. 53.

Year of birth missing
1781 deaths
Governors of Georgia (U.S. state)
Independent state governors of the United States
Georgia (U.S. state) Independents